Poland  hosted the World Games 2017 in Wrocław, Poland, from July 20, 2017 to July, 30 2017.

Medalists

Competitors

American Football
As the host nation, Poland has received a guaranteed place for Men competition.

Gymnastic

Rhythmic Gymnastics
Poland has qualified at the 2017 World Games:

Women's individual event - Anna Czarniecka

Trampoline
Poland has qualified at the 2017 World Games:

Men's Synchronized Trampoline - 1 quota

Korfball
Poland has qualified at the 2017 World Games in the Korfball Mixed Team event.

Lacrosse
Poland has qualified at the 2017 World Games in the Fistball Men Team event.

Sport Climbing
Poland has qualified at the 2017 World Games:

Men's Bouldering - 1 quota
Men's Lead - 1 quota
Men's Speed  - 1 quota
Women's Bouldering - 1 quota
Women's Lead - 1 quota
Women's Speed  - 1 quota

References 

Nations at the 2017 World Games
2017 in Polish sport
2017